I Love Velvet is a global provider of hardware and software for mobile point of sale (mPOS) transactions and value-added retail services. I Love Velvet manufactures and sells merchant-operated, consumer-facing and self-service mPOS systems to the entertainment, retail, hospitality, and automotive industries.

History

Founded in 2009 by former SAP AG, Oracle Corporation and retailing executives. The system was developed for enterprise retailers looking to process multiple forms of payments in multiple countries all housed in one single device called “The Brain”.

In 2013, I Love Velvet purchased Wexpay, a French online wallet company.

Product

I Love Velvet mobile POS is a cloud-based iPhone, iPad, Android, and Windows tablets, mobile point of sale (mPOS) or checkout system.  I Love Velvet mPOS has several large business customers such as German vehicle inspection company, Dekra. The system allows merchants to ring up sales, print or email receipts, open a wireless cash drawer, accept credit and debit card, EMV (for international Credit Cards) smart card, and NFC/RFID transactions, as well as print remotely from compatible hardware devices using the Velvet Store application. The back-end, web-based Velvet Cloud allows inventory, employee, and customer management, with analytics and reporting. The dashboard interface allows merchants to view real-time store sales and other data remotely.

International

I Love Velvet is headquartered in New York, New York with global design, hardware/software development and security support facilities in South Korea, China and Bulgaria.

See also
 Point-of-sale malware
 Cyber security standards
 List of cyber attack threat trends
 Cyber electronic warfare
 Malware
 Point of sale

References

External links
 Official ILV site
 glassdoor.com | Company Review
 Businesswire.com
Bloomberg.com

Credit cards
Retail point of sale systems
Point of sale companies